Kristin Louise Fairlie is a Canadian actress. In 1998, she won a Young Artist Award for Best Ensemble for her lead role in the Showtime original movie The Sweetest Gift. As a voice actress, Fairlie has voiced the roles of the title character in Little Bear, Bridgette in Total Drama, Carrie in Total Drama Presents: The Ridonculous Race and Emma in Stoked.

Career
Fairlie made her feature film debut in The Scarlet Letter. In 1999, she was among the winners of the Youth in Film Awards for Best Performance in a TV Movie/Pilot/Made-for-Video: Young Ensemble for her role in the Showtime television film The Sweetest Gift. Since then she appeared in the film The Virgin Suicides.

Fairlie voiced the supporting character of Nicole on the cartoon series Madeline. Since then she has lent her voice to many cartoons but she is best known as the voice of Little Bear in the animated series Little Bear and The Little Bear Movie. She starred as young Babar in the animated Feature film Babar: King of the Elephants, and appeared on the film's soundtrack. She is the voice of Bridgette on Total Drama, Emma on Stoked and Carrie in Total Drama Presents: The Ridonculous Race. Fairlie joined the cast of the Cartoon Network/Teletoon animated series Detentionaire. Other cartoons include Skyland, The Dating Guy, 6teen, Pearlie, Skatoony and Peg + Cat.

Fairlie has made guest appearances on TV series like Heartland, Murdoch Mysteries, The Eleventh Hour, and Goosebumps. Her guest-starring role on the series Flashpoint was noted by Kate Taylor of The Globe and Mail as "a chillingly convincing performance as a teenage bully". Fairlie appeared on the teen series renegadepress.com. Following the end of the series, she joined the cast of Instant Star to play Megan, the villain of the final season. The series was produced by Degrassi company Epitome Pictures for CTV and The N.

Fairlie starred in the Made for television film Gracie's Choice opposite Kristen Bell, Anne Heche, and Diane Ladd. Fairlie later appeared in the award-winning indie comedy You Might as Well Live as untalented pop singer Stormy Blaze – her performance of Stormy's first single garnered her a mention by Variety's Dennis Harvey: "though the soundtrack standout (duly reprised under closing credits) is "Stormy Blaze," aka the sister’s hilariously heinous debut single." In 2011, Fairlie appears in a cameo in the indie comedy Moonpoint, and in the Julia Roberts produced film Jesus Henry Christ.

Filmography

References

External links

 

1985 births
Actresses from Toronto
Canadian child actresses
Canadian film actresses
Canadian television actresses
Canadian video game actresses
Canadian voice actresses
Living people
People from Scarborough, Toronto
University of Guelph alumni
20th-century Canadian actresses
21st-century Canadian actresses